Merekotia Amohau (16 April 1898–30 December 1978) was a New Zealand  singer, entertainer and composer. Of Māori descent, she identified with the Ngāti Pikiao and Te Arawa iwi. She was born in Ohinemutu, Rotorua/Taupo, New Zealand on 16 April 1898. She was great-aunt of Anania Amohau who composed the words of the anthem of the 28th Maori Battalion.

References

1898 births
1978 deaths
Ngāti Pikiao people
Te Arawa people
New Zealand Māori women singers
20th-century New Zealand women singers